Drag is a cover album by k.d. lang, released in 1997; most of its songs feature a smoking motif, although some address broader issues of dependence and/or addiction. The cover of Dionne Warwick's "(Theme from) Valley of the Dolls" was notably used in key scenes in the pilot episode and series finale of the Showtime comedy-drama series Nurse Jackie. Lang's cover of "Hain't It Funny" was part of the soundtrack for the 2002 film Talk to Her.

Reception 
In an Allmusic review, Stephen Thomas Erlewine wrote, "A collection of covers that are somehow related to smoking, Drag is far more ambitious than the average cover record... lang's rich voice and the measured arrangements make Drag a ringer for Ingénue in places, but the tone is considerably lighter and more humorous, which certainly makes it an enjoyable listen."

Writing for the Los Angeles Times, Robert Hilburn wrote "The pace is sometimes slow and demanding and a couple of the songs are marginal, but the heart of this album combines mainstream pop accessibility and torch-driven cabaret intimacy in ways that seem absolutely addicting themselves."

Track listing

Personnel

k.d. lang – vocals
Teddy Borowieckl – piano, accordion, keyboard
Kevin Breit – banjo, guitar
Kimberly Brewer – background vocals
Lisa Coleman – keyboards
Anthony Cooke – cello
Larry Corbett – cello
Suzie Katayama – cello
Bruce Dukov – violin
Henry Ferber – violin
Ron Folsom – violin
Benji Gavabedian – violin
Connie Grauer – piano
Portia Griffin – background vocals
Jimmie Haskell – conductor
Jon Hassell – trumpet
Pat Johnson – violin
Karen Jones – violin
Dennis Karmazyn – cello
Ray Kelley – cello
Jerry Kessler – cello
Marva King – background vocals
Abe Laboriel Jr. – drums
Greg Leisz – pedal steel
Gayle Levant – harp
Joe Lovano – saxophone
Joy Lyle – violin
Wendy Melvoin – guitar
Sid Page – violin
David Piltch – bass
Barbara Porter – cello
Jay Rosen – violin
David Torn – guitar, kotar
Kim Zick – drums

Production
Producers: k.d. lang, Craig Street
Engineer: Danny Kopelson
Assistant engineer: Doug Boehm
Mixing: Patrick McCarthy
Mixing assistant: Mike Scotella
Mastering: Greg Calbi
Orchestration: Jimmie Haskell
Art direction: Linda Cobb, K.D. Lang
Design: Linda Cobb
Photography: Albert Sanchez

Charts

Weekly charts

Year-end charts

Certifications

References

1997 albums
Covers albums
K.d. lang albums
Albums produced by Craig Street
Warner Records albums